Westfield railway station was a station of the Auckland railway network in New Zealand. The station closed to all services on 12 March 2017, following an announcement by Auckland Transport on 17 January 2017, because fewer than 330 passengers used it daily and it required a costly upgrade.

The station was 640 metres south of Westfield Junction, where the Eastern and Southern Lines converge. It therefore served both lines. It had an island platform layout and was reached from a pedestrian overbridge at the end of Portage Road. The overbridge also spanned the adjacent Westfield marshalling yards and gives access to KiwiRail's operations centre and locomotive facility.

History
Westfield station was opened during the expansion of Auckland's suburban railway network; on June 1875 for goods and on 29 August 1887 for passengers. The original station building was just a wooden shelter on the platform. Mount Richmond Domain is nearby. The new station gave access to a shallow bay on Manukau Harbour, which became a popular picnic spot. In 1904 the station was at the western end of Portage Road, Otahuhu; which marks the narrowest point of the Auckland isthmus.

Westfield became a junction station between the North Island Main Trunk and the North Auckland Line when the Westfield deviation (Eastern Line) was completed in 1930.
 The station building was replaced with a newer shelter in the 1960s, whilst the adjacent Westfield Marshalling Yards were being built.

Both the platform and the footbridge were demolished in 2021.

Locomotive dump
During the 1920s, obsolete locomotives were often dumped in areas where the railway line was subject to erosion or soft ground, the value of scrap iron being minimal at the time. Unlike locomotives dumped at other sites, such as Branxholme, Omoto and Oamaru, where the locomotives remained for decades, the locomotives at Westfield were retrieved and sold for scrap.

Known locomotives dumped at Westfield

Other locomotive dumps
Bealey River
Branxholme
Mōkihinui River
Oamaru
Omoto
Waimakariri River

Westfield marshalling yard
This facility, built in the 1960s on reclaimed land brought together the freight train marshalling and sorting from several other yards in the Auckland area. Prior to its opening, freight trains were made up at either Auckland or Otahuhu stations. The traffic offices in other stations in the Auckland area were centred at Westfield during the 1970s and 1980s.
The locomotive and wagon repair facilities saw steam-era engine sheds and servicing facilities at Auckland, Otahuhu, Papakura, Helensville and Mercer all close as well as the 1950s-era Parnell Diesel Depot.

Industrial sidings
Westfield grew over time as a freight station. Sidings once served Kempthorne Prosser's fertiliser works, Westfield Freezing Works and Auckland City Abattoir.
Modern day sidings serve various transport companies, as well as the Southdown Freight Terminal and Metroport.

Patronage
During its latter period of service, the station had one of the lowest patronages of stations on the Auckland network, in part due to the decrepit nature of its facilities and its remote location, far from any main centres. The shelter structure was in poor condition, yet still provided some protection from the driving wind and rain which comes off the Manukau Harbour. In April 2010, the shelter was torn down and replaced with shelters formerly used at the temporary Newmarket stations.

Future

A future Third Main Line is envisaged as part of the Wiri to Quay Park project announced in 2017, which is to start in 2020 and be completed in 2024. It is expected to ease congestion on Auckland rail lines, improve rail freight access from the Port of Auckland to the Westfield yards and allow more frequent passenger and freight services. The new line would be between Westfield and Wiri or Wiri and Papakura.

See also 
 Westfield Junction 
 List of Auckland railway stations

References

Buildings and structures in Auckland
Rail transport in Auckland
Defunct railway stations in New Zealand
Railway stations opened in 1875
Railway stations closed in 2017